Fegyver- és Gépgyártó Részvénytársaság ("Arms and Machine Manufacturing Company"), known as FÉG, is a Hungarian  industrial conglomerate founded on 24 February 1891 in Csepel (now part of Budapest). The company came under the ownership of MPF Industry Group in 2010. It was an important arms manufacturing company before World War II. Since the acquisition, FÉG is one of the biggest exporters of HVAC products to the international markets in the East-Central European heating device industry.

Throughout its history it was renamed several times for various reasons; to Fémáru, Fegyver- és Gépgyár ("Metalware, Arms and Machine Factory") in 1935, to Lámpagyár ("Lamp Factory") in 1946, to Fegyver- és Gázkészülékgyár ("Arms and Gas Equipment Factory") in 1965. Decades later, in post-communist times it was renamed as FÉGARMY Fegyvergyártó Kft. ("FÉGARMY Arms Factory Ltd.").

1891-2004
On February 24, 1891, the legal predecessor of the Fegyver és Gépgyár (FÉG) was founded in Budapest. In the beginning the company produced rifles and pistols for the Austro-Hungarian Army and also exported its products for foreign armies.
The company became an important arms manufacturer in the country, but it also produced gas equipment, water heaters, lamps and miscellaneous metalware. The production of Diesel engines  started in 1899, when the Hungarian engineer Oszkár Epperlein (1844-1903) and Jenő Böszörményi (1872 - 1957) bought the patent rights of Diesel engines for the FÉG company from his collaborator Rudolf Diesel.

Through its history it always fulfilled a crucial role in supplying the Honvédség with small arms, this company also manufactured and exported a variety of semi-automatic pistols and rifles, including the P9M and the PJK-9HP models (copies of the famous Browning Hi-Power) and the FÉG PA-63 (a Walther PP/PPK clone in 9×18mm Makarov), but currently only self-loading pistols (P9L, P9M, P9R, etc.) and break-barrel air rifles (LG 427, LG 527). In Hungary, the company is also famous for its starting pistols, for example the GRP-9, as well as manufacturing most of the propane water boilers and heaters found in Hungarian houses.

2004-present
After 2004 many of its traditional export markets were put under embargo and this caused the company to stop its activity connected to the defence industry. At the end of 2010, FÉG almost went bankrupt when HUF 1.7 billion of funds disappeared from the company. MPF Industry Group made an important investment to rescue the company and restarted the production.  Since MPF Industry Group's reorganization, FÉG is one of the biggest East-Central European HVAC manufacturers.

See also
 :Category:Fegyver- és Gépgyár firearms

References

Manufacturing companies based in Budapest
Privately held companies of Hungary
Heating, ventilation, and air conditioning companies
Manufacturing companies established in 1891
Hungarian brands
Manufacturing companies of Austria-Hungary
1891 establishments in Hungary